The Common Law Admission Test (CLAT) is a centralized national-level entrance test for admissions to 24 National Law Universities (NLU) except NLU Delhi which takes admissions All India Law Entrance Test (AILET). A few private and self-financed law schools in India also use these scores for law admissions. Public sector undertakings in India like ONGC, Coal India, BHEL, Steel Authority of India, Oil India , Indian army for the recruitment of JAG officers etc. use CLAT Post Graduation (CLAT PG) scores for recruitment of legal positions in the companies.

The test is taken after the Higher Secondary Examination or the 12th grade for admission to integrated under-graduate degree in Law (BA/BBA/B.COM/B.SC
LLB)  and after Graduation in Law for Master of Laws (LL.M) programs offered by these law schools. It is considered as one of the toughest entrance examinations in India with the acceptance rate being as low as 3 percent.

Background

Before the introduction of Common Law Admission Test, the National Law Universities conducted their own separate entrance tests, requiring the candidates to prepare and appear separately for each of these tests. The schedule of the administration of these tests sometimes conflicted with the other or with other major entrance tests such as the Indian Institute of Technology Joint Entrance Examination and the National Eligibility cum Entrance Test. This caused students to miss tests and experience much stress.

There are 24 Universities in India, the first of which is the National Law School of India University, which admitted its first batch of students in 1988. Out of 24, the National Law University, Delhi conducts its own separate entrance test known as All India Law Entrance Test. With the emergence of other law schools, which also sought to conduct their admission tests at around the same time, students faced a hard time preparing for them. From time to time this issue to conduct a common entrance exam to reduce the burden of the students to give multiple test was raised, but given the autonomous status of each law school, there was no nodal agency to co-ordinate action to this regard.

The matter drew national attention when a Public Interest Litigation was filed by Varun Bhagat against the Union of India and various National Law Universities in the Supreme Court of India in 2006. The Chief Justice of India directed the Union of India to consult with the National Law Universities to formulate a common test. The move was strongly supported by the Bar Council of India.

Given the lack of a central nodal authority to bring forth a consensus on the issue, the Ministry of Human Resources Development, (Government of India) and the University Grants Commission of India organised a meeting of the Vice-Chancellors of seven National Law Universities along with the Chairman of the Bar Council of India. After a few such meetings, a Memorandum of Understanding (MoU) was signed by the Vice-Chancellors of the seven National Law Universities on 23 November 2007 to conduct a common admission test. The Common Law Admission Test was to be conducted each year by each of the law colleges and the responsibility of conducting the exam was to be rotated and given on the basis of seniority in the establishment. Nonetheless, the matter has not been resolved completely as there are other national law universities that were not taking part in CLAT. However, finally in 2015, a fresh MoU was signed by the sixteen National Law Universities, except for National Law University, Delhi for the CLAT 2015 being conducted by Dr. Ram Manohar Lohia National Law University, Lucknow whereby all the National Law Universities are now part of the centralized admission process without anyone being left out.

The Consortium of National Law Universities was established on 19 August 2017 with the aim of improving the standard of legal education in the country and justice system through legal education with Prof. R. Venkata Rao, erstwhile Vice-Chancellor, NLSIU as President and Prof. Faizan Mustafa, Vice-Chancellor, NALSAR, as Vice-President.

Eligibility
Only Indian nationals and NRIs can appear in the test. The foreign nationals desirous of taking admission to any course in any of the participating Law Universities may directly contact the concerned University having seats for foreign nationals. The Consortium of National Law Universities (NLUs) releases the CLAT eligibility criteria mentions details regarding the minimum educational qualification, minimum marks and age limit.

The eligibility requirements are as follows:

Under-Graduate Courses
Senior Secondary School/Intermediate (10+2) or its equivalent certificate from a recognized Board with not less than 45% marks in aggregate (40% in case of SC and ST candidates). There is no upper age restriction for the test.

Post-Graduate Courses
LL. B/B. L. Degree or an equivalent degree from a recognized University with not less than 50% marks in aggregate (45% in case of SC and ST candidates).
The candidates who have passed the qualifying degree examination through supplementary/ compartment and repeat attempts are also eligible for appearing in the test and taking Admission provided that such candidates will have to produce the proof of having passed the qualifying examination with fifty-five/fifty percent marks, as the case may be, on the date of their admission or within the time allowed by the respective universities.

Exam Pattern 
This law entrance exam is of two hours duration. The CLAT question paper consists of 150 multiple-choice questions. There are five sections in CLAT exam paper which are:
 English including Comprehension
 Current affairs including General Knowledge
 Legal Reasoning
 Logical Reasoning
 Quantitative Techniques (Maths)

All the questions will be paragraph-based starting from CLAT 2020. One paragraph will be followed by 5-6 questions.
The break up of marks is generally as follows :

Marking Scheme: For every correct answer, aspirants are given one mark and for each wrong answer 0.25 marks are deducted from their total score.

List of National Law Universities 
The list of the 23 out of 24 National Law Universities in India which accept admissions via CLAT :

 National Law School of India University, Bangalore
 NALSAR University of Law, Hyderabad
 National Law Institute University, Bhopal
 The West Bengal National University of Juridical Sciences, Kolkata
 National Law University ,  Jodhpur
 Hidayatullah National Law University, Raipur
 Gujarat National Law University, Gandhinagar along with it off-centre campus GNLU SILVASSA estd. from the academic year 2023-24
 Dr. Ram Manohar Lohia National Law University, Lucknow
National University of Advanced Legal Studies, Kochi
 Rajiv Gandhi National University of Law, Patiala
Chanakya National Law University, Patna
National Law University Odisha, Cuttack
 Damodaram Sanjivayya National Law University, Vishakhapatnam
National University of Study and Research in Law, Ranchi
 National Law School and Judicial Academy, Guwahati
 Tamil Nadu National Law University, Trichy
 Maharashtra National Law University, Mumbai 
 Maharashtra National Law University, Nagpur
 Maharashtra National Law University, Aurangabad
 Himachal Pradesh National Law University, Shimla
 Dharmashastra National Law University, Jabalpur
Dr. B.R. Ambedkar National Law University, Sonipat
National Law University Tripura , Agartala

Method of allocation
The CLAT form provides the students with a preference list. Each student fills the preference list, according to the colleges he/she desires. On the basis of these preferences and ranks obtained, students are allocated colleges. As the NLUs are established by the respective state governments, therefore most NLUs also have reservations for their domiciled candidates.

Conducting organisation
The first CLAT Core Committee consisting of Vice-Chancellors of the seven participating NLUs at that time decided that the test should be conducted by rotation in the order of their establishment. Accordingly, the first CLAT was conducted in 2008 by the National Law School of India University.  Subsequently, CLAT-2009, CLAT-2010, CLAT-2011, CLAT-2012, CLAT-2013, CLAT-2014, CLAT-2015, CLAT-2016, CLAT-2017, CLAT-2018 CLAT-2019 and CLAT-2020 have been conducted by NALSAR University of Law, Hyderabad, National Law Institute University, The West Bengal National University of Juridical Sciences,  National Law University, Jodhpur, Hidayatullah National Law University, Gujarat National Law University, Dr. Ram Manohar Lohia National Law University, Rajiv Gandhi National University of Law, Chanakya National Law University, National University of Advanced Legal Studies and National Law University Odisha respectively. However, from 2019 , CLAT  is conducted by Consortium of NLUs, a body consisting of Vice-chancellors of all the NLU's except NLU DELHI , which was formed in March, 2019.

Controversies
CLAT-2009, which was scheduled to be held on 17 May 2009 was rescheduled to 31 May 2009 due to leak of question papers.

CLAT-2011 candidates were disappointed with the standard of exam, as up to 12 questions in the various sections had underlined answers due to the oversight of the organisers and students also found the paper lengthy in comparison to the time limit provided (i.e. 2 hours).

CLAT-2012 was marred by a number of controversies, which includes allegations of setting questions out of syllabus and out of the pre-declared pattern. The declared rank list also contained an error, due to which the first list was taken down and a fresh list was put up. The declared question-answer keys contained several errors, which resulted in petitions being filed by the aggrieved students in different High Courts.

CLAT-2014 was conducted by GNLU, Gandhinagar and was also  heavily criticized for being poorly conducted with results being withdrawn and declared again. Even lawsuits had been filed for re-examination. The uploaded OMRs were then allowed to be physically verified in the GNLU Campus after students demanded the same.

CLAT-2017 the English paper had several errors.

CLAT-2018 students approached the Supreme Court since there were server problems during the examination. However, the Court refused to order a re-examination.

In 2020, NLSIU announced that it would be withdrawing from CLAT, and conducting its own entrance test, the National Law Aptitude Test (NLAT). However, the Supreme Court of India struck down the separate entrance test conducted by NLSIU and ordered it to re-join CLAT.

See also

References 

Standardised tests in India
Legal profession exams
Legal education in India
Year of establishment missing